Karina Socarrás Villalonga (born 28 November 1993), known simply as Karina, is a Puerto Rican footballer who plays as a forward for Portuguese Liga BPI club CS Marítimo and the Puerto Rico women's national team.

International career
On August 21, 2015, Socarrás scored six goals in a 12–0 win against Grenada, two days later Socarrás scored four goals in a 9–0 win against Aruba. On November 18, 2015, Socarrás helped Puerto Rico qualify for the 2016 Olympic Games qualifying tournament in Frisco, Texas scoring a goal against Guyana at the 2016 CONCACAF Women's Olympic Qualifying Championship qualification semi-finals. She represented Puerto Rico at the 2016 CONCACAF Women's Olympic Qualifying Championship.

International goals
 Scores and results list Puerto Rico's goal tally first, score column indicates score after each Socarrás goal.

References

External links
 

1993 births
Living people
Sportspeople from San Juan, Puerto Rico
Puerto Rican women's footballers
Women's association football forwards
Málaga CF Femenino players
Puerto Rico women's international footballers
Puerto Rican expatriate women's footballers
Puerto Rican expatriate sportspeople in Colombia
Expatriate women's footballers in Colombia
Puerto Rican expatriate sportspeople in Spain
Expatriate women's footballers in Spain
Puerto Rican expatriate sportspeople in Portugal
Expatriate women's footballers in Portugal